Kalyan (also Romanized as Kalyān and Kalian; also known as Qaliān and Qalyān) is a village in Kaghazkonan-e Shomali Rural District, Kaghazkonan District, Meyaneh County, East Azerbaijan Province, Iran. At the 2006 census, its population was 155, in 42 families.

References 

Populated places in Meyaneh County